Yevgeny Yurievich Fyodorov (born November 11, 1980) is a Russian former professional ice hockey centre who last  played for Edinburgh Capitals of the Elite Ice Hockey League (EIHL).

Fedorov was drafted in the seventh round, 201st overall by the Los Angeles Kings in the 2000 NHL Entry Draft.

Career statistics

Regular season and playoffs

International

References

External links

1980 births
Living people
Ak Bars Kazan players
HC Dynamo Moscow players
HC MVD players
HC Spartak Moscow players
Krylya Sovetov Moscow players
Metallurg Magnitogorsk players
Molot-Prikamye Perm players
Edinburgh Capitals players
Russian ice hockey centres
Sportspeople from Yekaterinburg
Los Angeles Kings draft picks
Russian expatriate sportspeople in Scotland
Russian expatriate ice hockey people
Expatriate ice hockey players in Scotland